"I Love You" is a song by Norwegian singer Tone Damli from her fourth studio album Cocool (2010). It was released in Norway on 27 April 2012. The song peaked at number 7 on the Norwegian Singles Chart.

Track listing

Chart performance

Release history

References

2010 singles
Tone Damli songs
2010 songs
Songs written by Ina Wroldsen